Dr. Marie Valentine McDemmond (1946 – July 27, 2022) was an American educator and third president of Norfolk State University, and the first African-American woman to serve as the head of a four-year college in Virginia. She served as president from 1997 to 2005, being the year she retired. Dr. Alvin J. Schexnider became acting president from July 2005 until June 30, 2006.

References

1946 births
2022 deaths
African-American academics
Presidents of Norfolk State University
University of Massachusetts Amherst College of Education alumni
University of New Orleans alumni
Xavier University alumni
21st-century African-American people
20th-century African-American people
People from Pompano Beach, Florida